Route 213 is a collector road in the Canadian province of Nova Scotia. It is located in the Halifax Regional Municipality, connecting Bedford at Trunk 2 (the Bedford Highway) with Upper Tantallon at Trunk 3 with interchanges with Highway 102 and Highway 103 located near the termini.

It is known as the "Hammonds Plains Road."

Route description

From its eastern terminus with the Trunk 2 (Bedford Highway) it is a 2-lane collector road until its junction with Highway 102. Heading west from Highway 102 it is four lanes to Gary Martin Drive. From Gary Martin Drive until Pockwock Road, it is a two-lane collector road with a speed limit of 70 km/h. From Pockwock Road until its terminus at Trunk 3 (St. Margaret's Bay Road), it is a two lane limited access road with a speed limit varying between 60 km/h and 80 km/h.

Hammonds Plains Road can get congested during rush hour, despite being a sub rural road. In August 2022 most of the speed limits were reduced by 10 km/h.

Communities along Route 213
Upper Tantallon
Stillwater Lake
English Corner
Hammonds Plains
West Bedford
Bedford

Major intersections

 (Bedford Highway)
 (Exit 3)
Innovation Drive
Gary Martin Drive
Bluewater Road (Atlantic Acres Industrial Park)
Larry Uteck Blvd.
Kingswood Drive/Gatehouse Run
Lucasville Road
Glen Arbour Way
Pockwock Road
Westwood Blvd.
 (Exit 5)
 (St. Margaret's Bay Rd).

See also
List of Nova Scotia provincial highways

References

External links
Satellite View of Route 213

Roads in Halifax, Nova Scotia
Nova Scotia provincial highways